Farmington, an  historic site in Louisville, Kentucky, was once the center of a hemp plantation owned by John and Lucy Speed. The 14-room, Federal-style brick plantation house was possibly based on a design by Thomas Jefferson and has several Jeffersonian architectural features. As many as 64 African Americans were enslaved by the Speed family at Farmington.

History
The Farmington site was part of a military land grant given to Captain James Speed in 1780. His son, John Speed, completed Farmington on a tract of land in 1816. Built in the Federal architectural style, the house is based on plans by Thomas Jefferson, which are now in the Coolidge Collection at the Massachusetts Historical Society.

Speed built the house for his wife, Lucy Gilmer Fry, daughter of Joshua Fry and granddaughter of Dr. Thomas Walker, the guardian of Thomas Jefferson. Her aunt and uncle's home in Charlottesville, Virginia was called Farmington and had an addition designed by Thomas Jefferson. 

Their son, Joshua Fry Speed, was an intimate, lifelong friend of Abraham Lincoln. While courting Mary Todd, Lincoln spent three weeks at Farmington in 1841 while recovering from mental and physical exhaustion. It was during this visit to Farmington in 1841 that Abraham Lincoln witnessed slavery on a plantation first-hand and he saw enslaved people chained together after he boarded a steamboat at the Louisville waterfront. In an 1855 letter to Joshua Speed, Lincoln wrote that the scene had continued to torment him.

John and Lucy's son, James Speed, was appointed Attorney General of the United States by Lincoln in 1863.

Design

Farmington consists of a single story above a raised basement. There are 14 rooms of living quarters on the first floor, with servant's and children's rooms on the basement floor. The first story is about five feet above ground level, with the basement windows completely above ground. All rooms in the basement are finished.

A simplified classical cornice under the hipped roof helps give the house its pleasing, proportional appearance. The front entrance is a tetrastyle portico (porch) with slender Doric columns, reached by 11 steps. The porch's gable features a semi-circular ventilation window.

The front door opens into a central hall which has a door at the back leading to a rear hall. These two halls give access to all rooms on the first floor, as well as stairs to the basement and attic. The stairs are hidden, which is a common feature of homes designed by Jefferson.

One of the octagonal rooms is a dining hall, the other is a parlor. Other rooms on the first floor are two bedrooms, a study and a family sitting room.

Preservation

Farmington has been restored as a tourist attraction and a re-creation of a 19th-century plantation. The house itself had been altered little at the time it was purchased by the Historic Homes Foundation for preservation in 1958. The only substantial change in its interior or exterior appearance since construction was the installation of a tin roof in place of the original wood shingles, which was done for fire safety reasons.

As of 2011, Farmington and a small visitors center are open to the public for tours and the site is available for special events and rentals.

In 2012, Farmington's owner, Historic Homes Foundation, Inc., entered into an agreement to sell 5 of the landmark's 18 acres to an adjoining landowner, Sullivan University, for use as a 300-space parking lot to be shared by both entities. Controversial questions about the proposal were raised in online media leading up to its consideration in the February 3, 2013 meeting of the Metro Louisville Landmarks Commission's Individual Landmarks Architectural Review Committee.

See also
Historic Locust Grove
History of Louisville, Kentucky
History of slavery in Kentucky
List of attractions and events in the Louisville metropolitan area
Louisville in the American Civil War
Riverside, The Farnsley-Moremen Landing

References

Further reading

External links

Farmington official web site
"Joshua and James Speed" — Article by Civil War historian/author Bryan S. Bush
Google Satellite Map

Houses completed in 1816
19th-century buildings and structures in Louisville, Kentucky
Houses in Louisville, Kentucky
Museums in Louisville, Kentucky
Tourist attractions in Louisville, Kentucky
Local landmarks in Louisville, Kentucky
National Register of Historic Places in Louisville, Kentucky
Historic house museums in Kentucky
Plantation houses in Kentucky
Plantations in Kentucky
Federal architecture in Massachusetts
1816 establishments in Kentucky
Hemp agriculture in the United States
Cannabis in Kentucky